In mathematics, an adherent point (also closure point or point of closure or contact point) of a subset  of  a topological space  is a point  in  such that every neighbourhood of  (or equivalently, every open neighborhood of ) contains at least one point of  A point  is an adherent point for  if and only if  is in the closure of  thus
 if and only if for all open subsets  if 

This definition differs from that of a limit point of a set, in that for a limit point it is required that every neighborhood of  contains at least one point of    Thus every limit point is an adherent point, but the converse is not true. An adherent point which is not a limit point is an isolated point.

Examples and sufficient conditions

A subset  of a metric space  contains all of its adherent points if and only if  is (sequentially) closed in

Adherent points and subspaces

Adherent points and sequences

If  is a subset of a topological space then the limit of a convergent sequence in  does not necessarily belong to  however it is always an adherent point of  Let  be such a sequence and let  be its limit. Then by definition of limit, for all neighbourhoods  of  there exists  such that  for all  In particular,  and also  so  is an adherent point of  

See also

Notes

Citations

References 

 Adamson, Iain T., A General Topology Workbook, Birkhäuser Boston; 1st edition (November 29, 1995). .
 Apostol, Tom M., Mathematical Analysis, Addison Wesley Longman; second edition (1974). 
 Lipschutz, Seymour; Schaum's Outline of General Topology, McGraw-Hill; 1st edition (June 1, 1968). . 
 L.A. Steen, J.A.Seebach, Jr., Counterexamples in topology, (1970) Holt, Rinehart and Winston, Inc.. 

General topology